Ian Lowry (born  in Moira, County Down, Northern Ireland) is a Northern Irish motorcycle racer.

Biography

Moving to racing
A former chef, Lowry started off in the British Supersport class in 2006. He raced there for 3 seasons, finishing 9th in this first season, 2nd in 2007 and 3rd in the 2008 championship.

British Superbike Championship
He then made the step to the British Superbike Championship in 2009 with the Relentless TAS Suzuki. He worked on his fitness in a university study pre-season. Lowry was a consistent points-scorer, racking up enough points for 5th overall despite failing to take a podium finish. He rounded off the season by competing in the Sunflower Trophy at Bishopscourt.

Spanish Moto 2, World and British Superbike Championships
TAS signed Michael Laverty and Alastair Seeley for 2010, leaving Lowry without a ride. He signed to race in the Spanish Moto2 championship, in a team ran by former Grand Prix winner Jeremy McWilliams, however the deal fell through. He also tested a BSB Motorpoint Yamaha in April 2010, as a potential short-term replacement for the injured Neil Hodgson. With Hodgson announcing his retirement on 22 April 2010, Lowry was confirmed as his replacement. However, two rounds later Lowry was replaced by Andrew Pitt. He made a BSB return for the Kawasaki SRT team in their one-off entry to the Brands Hatch bank holiday triple-header, and this continued into the Nurburgring World Superbike meeting, his debut in this class.
For 2011 Lowry signed for the Buildbase team who had moved from Kawasaki machinery to the new BMW S1000RR. The team struggled with the new bike, meaning that Lowry and team mate John Laverty struggled to score points, Lowry's best finish being a ninth in the second race at Snetterton. At the Cadwell park round after Lowry's bike blew up in a free practice session he was so upset with the team's lack of form that he decided to go home missing the Cadwell Park weekend.

Career statistics
Stats correct as of 9 July 2012

All time

By championship

British Supersport Championship

British Superbike Championship

 * Season still in progress

World Supersport Championship

World Superbike Championship

References

External links
Personal Website
BSB Profile

1986 births
Living people
Motorcycle racers from Northern Ireland
British Supersport Championship riders
British Superbike Championship riders
Supersport World Championship riders
Superbike World Championship riders